James Berkeley may refer to:

James Berkeley (died 1327), a medieval Bishop of Exeter
James Berkeley, 1st Baron Berkeley (c. 1394–1463), "James the Just", was an English peer
James Berkeley, 3rd Earl of Berkeley (aft. 1679–1736), First Lord of the Admiralty during the reign of George I
James P. Berkeley (1907–1985), Lieutenant General of the United States Marine Corps

See also
James Barkley, artist
James R. Barkley, Iowa politician
James Barclay (disambiguation)